Alvin Lewis was president, between 1892 and 1897, of the Seminary West of the Suwannee River, located in Tallahassee, Florida. This school later changed names several times, and is now Florida State University.

External links
Presidents of Florida State University

Presidents of Florida State University